Mikhail Larionovitch Mikhailov (16 January 1829 – 15 August 1865) was a Russian author.

Biography
He was educated at Saint Petersburg and engaged in literary pursuits as a translator, journalist and writer of fiction. His political sympathies caused his exile to Siberia.

Writing
He was a contributor to Sovremennik (“The Contemporary”) and an advocate of the reforms of the self-emancipation era. His collected translations and writings were published (3 vols., 1858–59).

Notes

References
 This source gives a birthyear of 1826, as does Nordisk familjebok, but all the Wikipedia articles in other languages on this topic use the date of 1829.

1829 births
1865 deaths
People from Orenburg
Journalists from the Russian Empire
Male writers from the Russian Empire
19th-century journalists
Russian male journalists
19th-century translators from the Russian Empire
19th-century male writers from the Russian Empire